Rho guanine nucleotide exchange factor (GEF) 35 is a protein in humans that is encoded by the ARHGEF35 gene.

References 

Genes on human chromosome 7